The 1991 Australian Open was a tennis tournament played on outdoor hard courts at Flinders Park in Melbourne in Victoria in Australia. It was the 79th edition of the Australian Open and was held from 14 through 27 January 1991.

Seniors

Men's singles

 Boris Becker defeated  Ivan Lendl 1–6, 6–4, 6–4, 6–4
 It was Becker's 5th career Grand Slam title and his 1st Australian Open title. He became the first male German player to win an Australian Open singles title.

Women's singles

 Monica Seles defeated  Jana Novotná 5–7, 6–3, 6–1
 It was Seles's 2nd career Grand Slam title and her 1st Australian Open title. She became the only Yugoslav player – male or female – to win a Grand Slam singles title.

Men's doubles

 Scott Davis /  David Pate defeated  Patrick McEnroe /  David Wheaton 6–7(4–7), 7–6(10–8), 6–3, 7–5
 It was Davis' only career Grand Slam title. It was Pate's only career Grand Slam title.

Women's doubles

 Patty Fendick /  Mary Joe Fernández defeated  Gigi Fernández /  Jana Novotná 7–6(7–4), 6–1
 It was Fendick's only career Grand Slam title. It was Fernandez's 1st career Grand Slam title and her only Australian Open title.

Mixed doubles

 Jo Durie /  Jeremy Bates defeated  Robin White /  Scott Davis 2–6, 6–4, 6–4
 It was Durie's 2nd and last career Grand Slam title and her only Australian Open title. It was Bates' 2nd and last career Grand Slam title and his only Australian Open title.

Juniors

Boys' singles
 Thomas Enqvist defeated  Stephen Gleeson 7–6, 6–7, 6–1

Girls' singles
 Nicole Pratt defeated  Kristin Godridge 6–4, 6–3

Boys' doubles
 Grant Doyle /  Joshua Eagle defeated  Jamie Holmes /  Paul Kilderry 7–6, 6–4

Girls' doubles
 Karina Habšudová /  Barbara Rittner defeated  Joanne Limmer /  Angie Woolcock 6–2, 6–0

External links
 Australian Open official website

 
 

 
1991 in Australian tennis
January 1991 sports events in Australia
1991,Australian Open